Courage for Two is a 1919 American silent comedy film directed by Dell Henderson and starring Carlyle Blackwell,  Evelyn Greeley and  Rosina Henley.

Cast
 Carlyle Blackwell as 	Anthony 'Tony' Douglas / Calvin Douglas
 Evelyn Greeley as 	Marion Westervelt
 Rosina Henley as 	Olive Herrick
 George MacQuarrie as Douglas Sr.
 Arda La Croix as 	Hubert 
 Henry West as Buck Comas
 Albert Gaston as 	Smiley Reilly
 Jack Drumier as 	Nichols
 Isabel O'Madigan as 	Mrs. Herrick
 Lettie Ford as 	Marion's Grandmother

References

Bibliography
 Connelly, Robert B. The Silents: Silent Feature Films, 1910-36, Volume 40, Issue 2. December Press, 1998.
 Munden, Kenneth White. The American Film Institute Catalog of Motion Pictures Produced in the United States, Part 1. University of California Press, 1997.

External links
 

1919 films
1919 comedy films
1910s English-language films
American silent feature films
Silent American comedy films
American black-and-white films
Films directed by Dell Henderson
World Film Company films
1910s American films